St. Joseph's Chapel may refer to:

St. Joseph's Chapel (Minto, North Dakota), listed on the National Register of Historic Places in Walsh County, North Dakota
St. Joseph's Chapel (Eau Claire, Wisconsin), listed on the National Register of Historic Places in Eau Claire County, Wisconsin
St. Joseph's Chapel (Clinton Corners, New York)